CJK Unified Ideographs 06300-077FF